KBAA (103.3 FM) is a radio station broadcasting a Regional Mexican format to the Grass Valley, California, United States, area as well as the area north of Sacramento. This station is currently owned by Alfredo Plascencia, through licensee Lazer Licenses, LLC. The station is a semi-simulcast of sister station KGRB, due to having KHHM next door at 103.5. On October 21, 2014, Adelante Media Group announced that it was selling KBAA, its sister stations and its LPTV outlet in Sacramento to Lazer Broadcasting, pending FCC approval The transaction was consummated on December 31, 2014, at a price of $2.9 million.

References

External links

BAA
BAA
Grass Valley, California